Kellerville may refer to the following geographical locations:
Kellerville, Illinois
Kellerville, Indiana
Kellerville, Missouri